Psara acrospila is a moth in the family Crambidae. It was described by Edward Meyrick in 1886. It is found on Fiji, Tonga, the Maldives, Mauritius and in the Democratic Republic of the Congo (Equateur, East Kasai).

The larvae feed on Bidens pilosa.

References

Spilomelinae
Moths described in 1886